The Panama Cafe is an historic structure located at 827 4th Avenue in the Gaslamp Quarter, San Diego, in the U.S. state of California. It was built in 1907.

See also

 List of Gaslamp Quarter historic buildings

References

External links
 

1907 establishments in California
Buildings and structures completed in 1907
Buildings and structures in San Diego
Gaslamp Quarter, San Diego